Cardamine concatenata, the cutleaved toothwort, crow's toes, pepper root or purple-flowered toothwort, is a flowering plant in Brassicaceae. It owes its name to the tooth-like appearance of its rhizome. It is a  perennial woodland wildflower native to eastern North America. It is considered a spring ephemeral and blooms in March, April, and/or May.

Description
The vegetative parts of this plant, which can reach 20–40 cm, arise from a segmented rhizome. The leaves are on long petioles, deeply and palmately dissected into five segments with large "teeth" on the margins. The white to pinkish flowers are held above the foliage in a spike. Fruit is an elongated pod which can be up to 4 cm long. Its native habitats include rich woods, wooded bottomlands, limestone outcrops, and rocky banks and bluffs.

Uses 
The roots can be washed, chopped and ground in vinegar to be used as a horseradish substitute.

References

External links
Flora of North America: Cardamine concatenata
Missouri Plants: Dentaria laciniata

concatenata
Ephemeral plants
Flora of North America
Plants described in 1803